The Gabonese Mixed Committee (CMG) was a political party in Gabon.

History
The CMG was established on 12 August 1946 by Léon M'ba, and was affiliated with the African Democratic Rally. In the 1952 Territorial Assembly elections it won two of the 24 elected seats.

In August 1953 the CMG merged with the Gabonese Democratic Party to form the Gabonese Democratic Bloc.

References

Rassemblement Démocratique Africain
Defunct political parties in Gabon
1946 establishments in Gabon
Political parties established in 1946
1953 disestablishments in Gabon
Political parties disestablished in 1953